The 12th African Games was held from 19 to 31 August 2019 in Rabat, Morocco. This was the first time that the African Games were hosted by Morocco following the country's readmission to the African Union in January 2017.

Bidding process
The 12th African Games was schedule in September 2019. Accra, Nairobi and Lusaka announced that they would bid for these Games, but none of them were selected.

Malabo, Equatorial Guinea was initially chosen to organise the 2019 African Games at the Second Ordinary Session of the Specialist Technical Committee on Youth, Culture and Sports, which was held at the headquarters of the African Union, in Addis Ababa, Ethiopia from 13 to 17 June 2016.

However, Equatorial Guinea was unable to host the Games due to economic problems. Lusaka, the capital of Zambia was later speculated to host the Games but refused, citing lack of facilities. In July 2018, Rabat, Morocco was selected to replace Malabo, Equatorial Guinea as host of the 2019 edition.

Venues

Rabat 

 Prince Moulay Abdellah Sports Complex (with Prince Moulay Abdellah Stadium) - athletics, karate, judo, taekwando, opening and closing ceremonies
 Urban Forest Ibn Sina Hilton - 3x3 Basketball
 Nahda Arena - weightlifting
 Al Amal Arena - boxing
 Ibn Rochd Center - gymnastics
 Bou Regreg Valley - triathlon
 Moulay Al Hassan Arena - table tennis
 Dar Essalam Royal Equestrian Complex - equestrian
 Cheminots Club - tennis

Salé 
Moulay Rachid National Sports Center - archery, fencing
Salle El Bouâzzaoui - volleyball
Al Arjat Shooting Center - shooting (skeet)
 Salé Beach - beach volleyball
 Mohamed Ben Abdellah Dam - rowing, canoe kayak (flatwater)
 Stade Boubker Ammar - football
 ASFAR Football Academy - football
 Stade des Chênes - football

Casablanca
 Stade Mohammed V Sports Complex - swimming, handball 
 Ain Chok Arena - badminton
 Grand Mogador Hotel - chess
 Hotel Farah - snooker

Benslimane 
 Cycling
 Stade Municipal El Mansouria - football

El Jadida
 El Jadida Sports Hall - wrestling

Branding 
The logo is a door with Moroccan mosaic, while the mascot is an Atlas lion or a Barbary lion.

Participating nations

Sports
The Rabat 2019 African Games featured 26 sports.

Calendar
The schedule of the games was as follows. The calendar was completed with event finals information.

Medal table

References

External links

 African Games 2019 Medal Tally

 
African Games
2019 in African sport
2019 in Moroccan sport
African Games
African Games
Sport in Rabat
21st century in Rabat
Sport in Casablanca